This is a list of mammals in Indiana. A total of 60 species are listed. Species currently extirpated in the state include the black bear, gray wolf, elk, American marten, cougar, fisher, porcupine, and bison.

The following tags are used to highlight each species' conservation status as assessed by the International Union for Conservation of Nature:

Opossums 

 Family Didelphidae (opossums)
 Subfamily: Didelphinae
 Genus: Didelphis
 Virginia opossum, D. virginiana

Armadillos 

 Family Dasypodidae (armadillos)
 Genus: Dasypus
 Nine-banded armadillo, D. novemcinctus

Insectivores 

Eulipotyphlans are insectivorous mammals. Shrews closely resemble mice, while moles are stout-bodied burrowers.

 Family Soricidae (shrews)
 Genus: Blarina
 Northern short-tailed shrew, B. brevicauda 
 Genus: Cryptotis
 North American least shrew, C. parva 
 Genus: Sorex
 Masked shrew, S. cinereus 
 Pygmy shrew, S. hoyi 
 Smoky shrew, S. fumeus 
 Southeastern shrew S. longirostris 
 Family Talpidae (moles)
 Genus: Scalopus
 Eastern mole, S. aquaticus

Rodents 

 Family Castoridae (beavers)
 Genus: Castor
 North American beaver, C. canadensis 
 Family Cricetidae (New World mice, rats, voles, lemmings, muskrats)
 Genus: Microtus
 Prairie vole, M. ochrogaster 
 Meadow vole, M. pennsylvanicus 
 Woodland vole, M. pinetorum 
 Genus: Oryzomys
 Marsh rice rat, O. palustris 
 Genus: Neotoma
 Allegheny woodrat, N. floridana 
 Genus: Ondatra
 Muskrat, O. zibethicus 
 Genus: Reithrodontomys
 Western harvest mouse, R. megalotis 
 Genus: Synaptomys
 Southern bog lemming, S. cooperi 
 Family Dipodidae (jumping mice)
 Genus: Zapus
 Meadow jumping mouse, Z. hudsonius 
 Family Erethizontidae (New World porcupines)
 Genus: Erethizon
 North American porcupine, E. dorsatum  extirpated
 Family Muridae (Old World mice and rats)
 Genus: Mus
 House mouse, M. musculus  introduced
 Genus: Rattus
 Brown rat, R. norvegicus  introduced
 Family Sciuridae (squirrels)
 Genus: Glaucomys
 Southern flying squirrel, G. volans 
 Genus: Marmota
 Groundhog, M. monax 
 Genus: Sciurus
 Eastern gray squirrel, S. carolinensis 
 Fox squirrel, S. niger 
 Genus: Poliocitellus
 Franklin's ground squirrel, P. franklinii 
 Genus: Tamiasciurus
 American red squirrel, T. hudsonicus 
 Genus: Ictidomys
 Thirteen-lined ground squirrel, I. tridecemlineatus 
 Genus: Tamias
 Eastern chipmunk, T. striatus 
 Family Geomyidae (pocket gophers)
 Genus: Geomys
 Plains pocket gopher, G. bursarius

Lagomorphs 

 Family Lagomorpha (rabbits, hares and pikas)
 Genus: Sylvilagus
 Swamp rabbit, S. aquaticus 
 Eastern cottontail, S. floridanus

Bats 

 Family Vespertilionidae (vesper bats)
 Genus: Corynorhinus
 Rafinesque's big-eared bat, C. rafinesquii 
 Genus: Eptesicus
 Big brown bat, E. fuscus 
 Genus: Lasionycteris
 Silver-haired bat, L. noctivagans 
 Genus: Lasiurus
 Eastern red bat, L. borealis 
 Hoary bat, L. cinereus 
 Genus: Myotis
 Southeastern myotis, M. austroriparius 
 Gray bat, M. grisescens 
 Eastern small-footed myotis, M. leibii 
 Little brown bat, M. lucifugus 
 Northern long-eared bat, M. septentrionalis 
 Indiana bat, M. sodalis 
 Genus: Nycticeius
 Evening bat, N. humeralis 
 Genus: Perimyotis
 Tricolored bat, P. subflavus

Carnivores 

 Family Canidae (canids)
 Genus: Canis
 Coyote, C. latrans 
 Gray wolf, C. lupus  extirpated
 Genus: Urocyon
 Gray fox, U. cinereoargenteus 
 Genus: Vulpes
 Red fox, V. vulpes 
 Family Procyonidae (raccoons)
 Genus: Procyon
 Common raccoon, P. lotor 
 Family Ursidae (bears)
 Genus: Ursus
 American black bear, U. americanus  extirpated
 Family Felidae (cats)
 Genus: Lynx
 Bobcat, L. rufus 
 Genus: Puma
 Cougar, P. concolor  extirpated
 Family Mustelidae (weasels, minks, martens, fishers, and otters)
 Genus: Lontra
 North American river otter, L. canadensis 
 Genus: Martes
 American marten, M. americana  extirpated
 Genus: Mustela
 Least weasel, M. nivalis 
 Genus: Neogale
 Long-tailed weasel, N. frenata 
 American mink, N. vison 
 Genus: Pekania
 Fisher, P. pennanti  extirpated
 Genus: Taxidea
 American badger, T. taxus 
 Family Mephitidae (skunks)
 Genus: Mephitis
 Striped skunk, M. mephitis

Even-toed ungulates
Family Cervidae (deer)
Genus: Cervus
Elk, C. canadensis  extirpated
Genus: Odocoileus
White-tailed deer, O. virginianus  
Family Bovidae (bovids)
Genus: Bison
American bison, B. bison  extirpated

See also
 Lists of mammals by region
 List of U.S. state mammals
 List of birds of Indiana

References

Mammals
Illinois